Pierre Leverne Dease (born July 12, 1982), better known by the stage name Nina Bo'nina Brown, is an American drag queen and television personality best known for starring on the ninth season of RuPaul's Drag Race, where she placed sixth.

Early life 
Dease was born on July 12, 1982. She was born and raised in Columbia, South Carolina before moving to Riverdale, Georgia, where she currently resides.

Career

Early drag career 
Brown made her drag performance debut under the stage name 'Shameekah' in 2009. Before adopting her current name, she also performed under the stage names 'Beatta Bitchass' and 'Lady Guinavere'. 

In 2013, Brown began uploading makeup tutorials to her YouTube channel. These videos, along with uploads of her casting auditions for seasons five through eight, gained Brown prominence in the drag community. She was the makeup artist for some of Phi Phi O'Hara's looks for her "365 Days of Drag" project.

RuPaul's Drag Race 
Brown auditioned for RuPaul's Drag Race seasons five through eight. She was announced as one of fourteen contestants competing on the ninth season of RuPaul's Drag Race on February 2, 2017. 

The premier of season 9, Drag Race's first episode on VH1, aired on March 24, 2017. Brown entered the Werkroom in a mouse look made of paper with the entrance line, "I'm Nina, Bo'nina, Banana, Fofana, Osama Bin Laden Brown! Boom! Boom! Boom! Boom!" She was the winner of the premiere episode's challenge (Miss Charisma, Uniqueness, Nerve and Talent), guest judged by Lady Gaga.

In episode five, Brown voiced her frustrations on not being cast as model Blac Chyna for the Rusical challenge. She named her 2018 tour "I Shoulda Been Blac Chyna" after this moment. Drag Race alumni Alaska also referenced this moment in a line of her song "Valentina". 

Brown placed in the bottom two three times, eliminating Aja and Valentina. She was eliminated on the makeover challenge episode after losing a lip sync of "Cool for the Summer" by Demi Lovato against Shea Couleé.

Fashion Photo RuView 
Brown and Vanessa Vanjie Mateo guest hosted four episodes of the WOWPresents internet series Fashion Photo RuView between November 2018 and January 2019.

Rawview YouTube series 
Since the premier of All Stars 4 in 2018, Brown has self-published reviews of Rupaul's Drag Race and its international spin-off series on her YouTube channel.  Rawviews are generally segmented into general discussion, reading tips and comments, 'Beauty and Looks', and a live reaction to the respective episode. 

In addition to reviewing Drag Race, Brown has created Rawviews for other shows including The Boulet Brothers' Dragula and WOW Presents Plus series Painted with Raven.

MAC Cosmetics Campaign 
In June 2018, she was sponsored by MAC Cosmetics to review and promote the 2018 Aaliyah collection. She dressed as a humanoid zebra in the July 2018 issue of Paper, modeling for Gypsy Sport's Fall 2018 campaign. She modeled again for Gypsy Sport's Spring 2019 campaign.

Personal life 
Dease is openly gay. Prior to filming season nine of Drag Race, he relocated to Atlanta, Georgia.

In RuPaul's Drag Race: Untucked, Dease stated that his audition for season nine was going to be his final attempt. According to Dease, being rejected from seasons five through eight played a role in his depression and anxiety.

Controversy
In 2017, Nina Bo’nina Brown received backlash for sending fan favorite Valentina home in a lipsync for your life on the 9th episode of the ninth season of RuPaul's Drag Race. The elimination went down as one of the shows most controversial lipsyncs and placed in Gay Times Top 10 Most Controversial RuPaul’s Drag Race Eliminations.

In 2021, Nina Bo’nina Brown was accused of making transphobic comments about Gottmik, a contestant on the thirteenth season of RuPaul's Drag Race; Kade Gottlieb (aka Gottmik) is a transgender male. Brown's comments, which included frequent jokes about Gottmik's tuck, prompted criticism from several RuPaul’s Drag Race contestants, with many stars defending Gottmik, including Yvie Oddly, Jackie Cox, Denali, Kameron Michaels, and Jan Sport, as well as Bimini Bon-Boulash, Joe Black, Cheryl Hole, and Crystal from RuPaul's Drag Race UK. Brown claimed that the criticism was unwarranted and denied accusations of transphobia.

Filmography

Television

Web series

References 

1982 births
Living people
African-American drag queens
American YouTubers
Gay entertainers
LGBT African Americans
LGBT people from Georgia (U.S. state)
LGBT people from South Carolina
LGBT YouTubers
People from Atlanta
People from Columbia, South Carolina
Nina Bo'nina Brown
People from Riverdale, Georgia
21st-century American LGBT people